The 1904–05 international cricket season was from September 1904 to April 1905.

Season overview

February

England in the West Indies

March

Australia in New Zealand

Australia in Fiji

References

International cricket competitions by season
1904 in cricket
1905 in cricket